Magentalane was the fifth and final album of new material by the Canadian rock group Klaatu.

Recording and Background
For their final album, Klaatu regained complete artistic control over the music, marking a return to their familiar psychedelic pop sound, after their previous album Endangered Species was essentially a product of Capitol Records’ attempt to commercialise the band, and therefore featured outside musicians playing most of the instruments heard on the record.

The advance budget for Magentalane helped make E.S.P. Studios of Buttonville, Ontario, a professional studio in 1980. E.S.P. was owned by Klaatu member Dee Long and partner John Jones, who both went on to George Martin's AIR Studios in London in 1985.

Track 5, "December Dream," was written as a tribute to John Lennon, who had been killed 10 months prior to the album's release. At the end of the track, the lyrics "the dream is over" are said, likely as a reference to the same lines at the end of Lennon's Plastic Ono Band track "God."

Release
Since Capitol Records had terminated Klaatu, following the commercial failure of their previous album, Endangered Species, Magentalane was only released in Canada and Mexico, although it was reissued worldwide in 1995 on Compact Disc by Permanent Press Records.

The sound of a springing mousetrap is present on the album, followed by the sound of a mouse running away. According to John Woloschuk, this was intended to allow Klaatu's fanbase to know that Magentalane was likely to be Klaatu's last studio album.

Reception
In a positive review, PopMatters called the album “a retrospective on the past 20 years of psychedelic pop”.

AllMusic's Jason Ankeny, while giving the album only a lukewarm rating, praised the album for its songwriting, which it described as “vintage McCartney”. AllMusic's Dave Sleger dismissed Magentalane and the two previous Klaatu albums as "downright ghastly pop-rock affairs that lacked originality".

Track listing

Notes
 The album ends with a mouse squeak. On some releases, this is a separate unlisted track titled "End".

Personnel
Klaatu
John Woloschuk - vocals, piano, acoustic guitar, keyboards, bass guitar, vibraphone, electric sitar, ocarina, glockenspiel
Dee Long - vocals, electric guitar, mandolin, slide guitar, Korg synthesizer
Terry Draper - drums, percussion, Polymoog synthesizer, trombone, tambourine, vocals

Additional musicians
John Johnson - saxophone solo on "The Love of a Woman"
Memo Acevedo - conga on "The Love of a Woman"
Adele, Paul and Dick Armin - strings on "The Love of a Woman", "December Dream" and "Maybe I'll Move to Mars"
George Bertok - piano on "Blue Smoke"
Lorne Grossman - tympani and chimes on "December Dream" and "Maybe I'll Move to Mars"
Paul Irvine - trumpet and trombone on "December Dream" and "Maybe I'll Move to Mars
Jill Vogel, Anna Draper and Linda Davies - backing vocals on "Mrs. Toad's Cookies"
Frank Watt (drums), Ken Wannamaker (bass), Dave Kennedy (guitar) on At The End of the Rainbow.

References

Klaatu (band) albums
Capitol Records albums
1981 albums